Vaalajärvi is a medium-sized lake in the Kemijoki main catchment area. It is located in Sodankylä municipality in the region Lapland in Finland. In the area there is a canoeing route lake Vaalajärvi–river Jeesiöjoki–river Kitinen.

See also
List of lakes in Finland

References

Kemijoki basin
Landforms of Lapland (Finland)
Lakes of Sodankylä